Kenneth Garrett (September 23, 1953) is an American photographer of archaeology who was born in Columbia, Missouri and made 70 photos for National Geographic. In 1970 and 1972 he took a course in photojournalism at the University of Missouri and four years later went to University of Virginia where he got his bachelor's degree in anthropology. Currently he specializes in archaeology and paleontology. His photographs of Egyptian and Mayan archaeological findings are displayed in museums such as the Smithsonian and in other countries of the world such as Cuba, Egypt and Japan.

References

1953 births
American archaeologists
American paleontologists
American photographers
Artists from Columbia, Missouri
University of Missouri alumni
University of Virginia alumni
Living people